Otto Ohlendorf (4 February 1907 – 7 June 1951) was a German SS functionary and Holocaust perpetrator during the Nazi era. In 1941, Ohlendorf was appointed the commander of  D, which perpetrated mass murder in Moldova, south Ukraine, the Crimea and, during 1942, the North Caucasus. He was tried at the Einsatzgruppen Trial, sentenced to death, and executed by hanging in 1951.

Life and education
Born in Hoheneggelsen (today part of Söhlde; then in the Kingdom of Prussia), Otto Ohlendorf came into the world as part of "a farming family". He joined the Nazi Party in 1925 and the SS in 1926. Ohlendorf studied economics and law at the University of Leipzig and the University of Göttingen, and by 1930 was already giving lectures at several economic institutions. He studied at the University of Pavia, where he gained his doctor's degree in jurisprudence; and by 1933 he obtained the position of a research directorship in the Kiel Institute for the World Economy. Ohlendorf was active in the National Socialist Students' League in both Kiel and Göttingen and taught at the Nazi Party's school in Berlin. He participated in major debates between the SS, the German Labour Front, and the Quadrenniel Organization on economic policy. By 1938 he was also manager in the Trade section of the Reich Business Board. Historian Christian Ingrao quips that for Ohlendorf, Nazism was a "quest for race" in the historical continuum, and even though he never stated it that way, his faith in Germandom was akin to that of his fellow SS intellectuals.

SS career

Ohlendorf joined the SD in 1936 and became an economic consultant of the organisation. Like other talented academics such as Helmut Knochen and Franz Six, Ohlendorf had been recruited by SD talent scouts. Attached to the SS with the rank of SS-Hauptsturmführer, by 1939, he had obtained the rank of SS-Standartenführer and was appointed as head of Amt III (SD-Inland) of the Reich Security Main Office (RSHA), a position he kept until 1945. His role in collecting intelligence from his secret police agents was disliked by some of the Nazi leadership. Reichsführer-SS Heinrich Himmler once characterized Ohlendorf as "an unbearable Prussian" who was "without humour". Nonetheless, Ohlendorf was instrumental as a member of the SD in shaping Nazi economic doctrine, which became "increasingly virulent as the war progressed" as he attempted to mould the economy "in an ethnic context". It was Ohlendorf's responsibility as head of the SD-Inland to collect data and scientifically examine social, cultural, and economic issues, assembling reports to his superiors in the Nazi government. Routine public opinion surveys—which were under the purview of Ohlendorf and SS-Major Reinhard Höhn—constituted some of these reports. These public opinion polls on the social climate of Nazi Germany were both unpopular and controversial.

In June 1941, Reinhard Heydrich appointed Ohlendorf to be commander of Einsatzgruppe D, which operated in southern Ukraine and Crimea. Joining the Einsatzgruppen was an unappealing prospect and Ohlendorf refused twice before his eventual appointment. Transfers from the RSHA to the Einsatzgruppen were in part due to personnel shortages but also to keep the initial killing operations confined to those who already knew the details, such as Ohlendorf, Arthur Nebe, and Paul Blobel. Einsatzgruppe D was the smallest of the task forces, but was supplemented by Romanians along their way through the killing fields of Bessarabia, southern Ukraine, and the Caucasus. Additional manpower for Einsatzgruppe D came from Ukrainian auxiliary police formations. Supporting military operations, Ohlendorf's group was attached to the Eleventh Army. Ohlendorf's Einsatzgruppe in particular was responsible for the 13 December 1941 massacre at Simferopol, where at least 14,300 people, mostly Jews, were killed. Over 90,000 murders throughout Ukraine and the Caucusus are attributed to Ohlendorf's unit.

Ohlendorf disliked the use of the oft-employed Genickschuß (shot to the back of the neck) and preferred to line up victims and fire at them from a greater distance so as to alleviate personal responsibility for individual murders. All forms of contact between the firing squads and victims were limited—per Ohlendorf's insistence—until the last moments before the killing started, and up to three rifleman were allocated to each person about to be shot. To ensure the group killing mentality, Ohlendorf forbade any commando from taking individual actions and explicitly instructed his men not to take any of the victim's valuables. One of Ohlendorf's most trusted "proper" military-style murderers, SS-Haupsturmführer Lothar Heimbach, once exclaimed, "A man is the lord over life and death when he gets an order to shoot three hundred children—and he kills at least one hundred fifty himself."

Many of the killing operations were personally overseen by Ohlendorf, who wanted to ensure they were "military in character and humane under the circumstances". The number of persons killed under the leadership of Einsatzgruppen commanders such as Ohlendorf are "staggering" despite the use of varying murder techniques. On 1 August 1941, Einsatzgruppen commanders including Ohlendorf, received instructions from Gestapo chief Heinrich Müller to keep headquarters (Hitler especially) informed of their progress in the East; Müller also encouraged the speedy delivery of photographs showing the results of these operations. During September 1941, Ohlendorf's group slaughtered 22,467 Jews and communists at Mykolaiv near the Black Sea port of Odesa.

Due to the Wehrmacht's insistence that Ukraine's agricultural production was needed to sustain its military campaign, Ohlendorf was asked during October 1941 to refrain from killing some of the Jewish farmers—a request he honored—but one which earned him Himmler's contempt. This act should not be seen as a change of heart or kindness, as just a month prior in September 1941, Ohlendorf reported to his men that "from now on the Jewish question is going to be solved and that means liquidation". From that month forward, the Einsatzgruppen had begun the process of systematically shooting not just men but women and children, a transition that historian Peter Longerich terms "a decisive step on the way towards a policy of racial annihilation".

Between February and March 1942, Himmler ordered that gas vans should be used to murder women and children so as to reduce the strain on the men, but Ohlendorf reported that many of the Einsatzkommandos refused to utilize them since burying the victims proved an "ordeal" afterwards. When gas van killing operations were conducted, it was usually at night to keep the population from witnessing the macabre affair. After the victims' deaths, Jewish  were forced to unload the bodies, clean the excrement and feces from inside the van's gas chamber, and once the clean up was complete, were themselves immediately shot. As far as Ohlendorf was concerned, the gas vans were impracticable for the scale of killing demanded by Himmler; namely, since they could only kill between fifteen and twenty-five persons at a time.

Historian Donald Bloxham referred to Ohlendorf as a bureaucrat, who was trying to "prove himself in the field". Another historian, Mark Mazower, described Ohlendorf as a "gloomy, driven, self-righteous Prussian". His commitment to the Nazi cause kept him in Ukraine longer than any of his comrades, and while he may have disliked the political direction in which Germany was headed, he never registered complaints about murdering Jews. He did, however, express misgivings about the barbarity and sadism being meted out by the Romanian units that accompanied the Einsatzgruppen in their murderous tasks, since they were not only leaving a trail of corpses in their wake, they were also pillaging and raping in the process. Ohlendorf also lodged a complaint about the Romanian forces, who drove thousands of frail elderly persons and children from Bessarabia and Bokovina—all incapable of work—into German-held regions, which his men forced back into Romanian territory but not without killing a significant percentage of them as a result.

Ohlendorf devoted only four years (1939–1943) of full-time activity to the RSHA, for in 1943, in addition to his other jobs, he became a deputy director general in the Reich Ministry of economic affairs. Sometime in November 1944, he was promoted to Gruppenführer. Believing their expertise invaluable, Ohlendorf, Ludwig Erhard, and other experts concerned themselves with how to stabilize German currency after the war. Hoping to salvage the reputation of the SD, Ohlendorf offered his services in the hopes that he could shape the postwar reconstruction of Germany, but along "National Socialist lines", remaining convinced as was Admiral Karl Dönitz (who gave Ohlendorf the economics portfolio), that some form of Nazism would ultimately survive.

In May 1945, Ohlendorf participated in Himmler's flight from Flensburg. He and several other subordinates were arrested by the British near Lüneburg on 23 May 1945. Himmler committed suicide shortly after being captured. For several weeks after his arrest, Ohlendorf was carefully interrogated, during which he revealed the criminal nature of the German campaign in the East.

Nuremberg trials

Ohlendorf was called as a witness by the prosecution during the International Military Tribunal at Nuremberg on 3 January 1946. During the subsequent Einsatzgruppen trial, Ohlendorf was the chief defendant, and was also a key witness in the prosecution of other indicted war criminals. Ohlendorf's apparently reliable testimony was attributed to his distaste for the corruption in Nazi Germany and a stubborn commitment to duty. The court examined Ohlendorf concerning Einsatzgruppen operations in particular. During the trial, Ohlendorf insisted that he, as a loyal Nazi, had acted properly and had done nothing wrong. He expressed no remorse for his actions, telling prosecutor Ben Ferencz that the Jews of America would suffer for what the prosecutor had done, and seemed to have been more concerned about the moral strain on those carrying out the murders than those being murdered.

At the trial, Ohlendorf attempted to present the operations in the Soviet area "not as a racist programme for the annihilation of all the Jews ... but as a general liquidation order primarily aimed at 'securing' the newly won territory". Defending his actions, Ohlendorf compared Einsatzgruppen activities to the Biblical Jewish extirpation of its enemies; he likewise claimed that his firing squads were "no worse than the 'press-button killers' who dropped the atom bomb on Japan".

Despite his attempts to establish moral equivalency for atrocities upon the Allies, Otto Ohlendorf was convicted of crimes against humanity and war crimes committed during World War II. He was sentenced to death in April 1948 and spent three years in detention before being hanged at the Landsberg Prison in Bavaria on 7 June 1951.

References

Explanatory notes

Citations

Bibliography

External links

 
 "Otto Ohlendorf, Einsatzgruppe D, and the ‘Holocaust by Bullets’," 13 January 2021 biographical article by Jason Dawsey (National World War II Museum, New Orleans, LA)

1907 births
1951 deaths
Einsatzgruppen personnel
Executions by the United States Nuremberg Military Tribunals
German people convicted of crimes against humanity
German prisoners of war in World War II held by the United Kingdom
Holocaust perpetrators in Russia
Holocaust perpetrators in Ukraine
Lawyers in the Nazi Party
People from Hildesheim (district)
People from the Province of Hanover
Reich Security Main Office personnel
SS-Gruppenführer
Executed mass murderers